Saonia is a Gram-negative, aerobic and rod-shaped genus of bacteria from the family of Flavobacteriaceae with one known species (Saonia flava). Saonia flava has been isolated from coastal seawater from the north-western Mediterranean Sea,

References

Flavobacteria
Bacteria genera
Monotypic bacteria genera
Taxa described in 2017